Corticarina is a genus of beetles in the family Latridiidae, containing the following species:

 Corticarina acuta Johnson, 1975
 Corticarina acutoides Johnson, 1975
 Corticarina adamsi Johnson, 1981
 Corticarina alberta Fall, 1893
 Corticarina alemannica Schiller, 1984
 Corticarina amoena Johnson, 1981
 Corticarina amplipennis (Motschulsky, 1867)
 Corticarina angelensia Rücker, 1990
 Corticarina antipodum (Belon, 1885)
 Corticarina arcuata Rücker, 1979
 Corticarina ashei Johnson, 1997
 Corticarina australis (Blackburn, 1891)
 Corticarina baranowskii Johnson, 1989
 Corticarina beloni Johnson, 1981
 Corticarina benardi Dajoz, 1970
 Corticarina bhutanensis Johnson, 1977
 Corticarina bicolor Dajoz, 1970
 Corticarina biharensis Johnson, 1979
 Corticarina blatchleyi Johnson, 1989
 Corticarina boliviensis Rücker, 1981
 Corticarina brasiliensis Johnson, 1981
 Corticarina broadheadi Johnson, 1981
 Corticarina brooksi Johnson, 1997
 Corticarina bruta Johnson, 1977
 Corticarina carinifrons Johnson, 1989
 Corticarina cavicollis (Mannerheim, 1844)
 Corticarina centralis (Sharp, 1902)
 Corticarina championi Johnson, 1972
 Corticarina chinensis Johnson, 1972
 Corticarina clareae Johnson, 1972
 Corticarina clarula (Broun, 1895)
 Corticarina clayae Johnson, 1981
 Corticarina coei Johnson, 1972
 Corticarina cognata Johnson, 1972
 Corticarina conjuncta Johnson, 1997
 Corticarina convexipennis (Motschulsky, 1861)
 Corticarina curta (Wollaston, 1854)
 Corticarina curta oblongipennis Johnson, 1981
 Corticarina cyathigera Rücker, 1987
 Corticarina cylindronata (Motschulsky, 1866)
 Corticarina dajozi Johnson, 1975
 Corticarina darbyi Johnson, 1991
 Corticarina delicatula (Wollaston, 1871)
 Corticarina derougemonti Johnson, 1975
 Corticarina duplicata (Sharp, 1902)
 Corticarina eichlini Andrews, 1992
 Corticarina excavata Johnson, 1977
 Corticarina exigua (Mannerheim, 1853)
 Corticarina fornicata Otto, 1978
 Corticarina franzi Johnson, 1975
 Corticarina fraudulenta Johnson, 1972
 Corticarina fukiensis Johnson, 1989
 Corticarina gangolae Johnson, 1970
 Corticarina globifera (Motschulsky, 1867)
 Corticarina gracilenta Johnson, 1979
 Corticarina gracilicornis Jeannel & Paulian, 1945
 Corticarina guatemalica Johnson, 1997
 Corticarina guptai Johnson, 1979
 Corticarina guyanensis Dajoz, 1970
 Corticarina hammondi Johnson, 1972
 Corticarina hancocki Johnson, 1979
 Corticarina herbivagans (Le Conte, 1855)
 Corticarina hierroensis Johnson,
 Corticarina hoegei Johnson, 1979
 Corticarina horrida (Belon, 1897)
 Corticarina hova Johnson, 1981
 Corticarina ignea Johnson, 1979
 Corticarina impensa Johnson, 1997
 Corticarina inobservata Johnson, 1997
 Corticarina irkutensis Strand, 1968
 Corticarina johnsoni Rücker, 1979
 Corticarina kekenboschi Dajoz, 1970
 Corticarina khnzoriani Johnson, 1976
 Corticarina kiymbiae Rücker, 1982
 Corticarina klapperichi Johnson, 1981
 Corticarina kraussi Johnson, 1981
 Corticarina lambiana (Sharp, 1910)
 Corticarina latipennis (Sahlberg, 1871)
 Corticarina leleupi Rücker, 1982
 Corticarina lescheni Johnson, 1997
 Corticarina lobeliae Johnson, 1975
 Corticarina longipennis (Le Conte, 1855)
 Corticarina lutea Rücker, 1978
 Corticarina milleri Andrews, 1992
 Corticarina minuta (Fabricius, 1792)
 Corticarina montana Johnson, 1979
 Corticarina nakanei Johnson, 1976
 Corticarina nigerrima Johnson, 1975
 Corticarina nigra Johnson, 1975
 Corticarina nilgiriensis Johnson, 1979
 Corticarina orientalis Rücker, 1982
 Corticarina ovata Rücker, 1980
 Corticarina ovipennis (Motschulsky, 1867)
 Corticarina pacata (Broun, 1886)
 Corticarina paradoxa Saluk, 1992
 Corticarina parallela Johnson, 1972
 Corticarina parvula (Mannerheim, 1844)
 Corticarina planiuscula (Motschulsky, 1867)
 Corticarina portentosa Johnson, 1997
 Corticarina prashanta (2019)
 Corticarina pulchella Johnson, 1975
 Corticarina pullula (Motschulsky, 1867)
 Corticarina pusilla (Mannerheim, 1844)
 Corticarina rectangula (Motschulsky, 1867)
 Corticarina regularis (Le Conte, 1855)
 Corticarina reidi Johnson, 1989
 Corticarina rickardi Johnson, 1997
 Corticarina riedeli Johnson, 1991
 Corticarina riveti Johnson, 1981
 Corticarina rotundipennis (Wollaston, 1854)
 Corticarina saluki Johnson, 2006
 Corticarina scissa (Le Conte, 1855)
 Corticarina scotti Johnson, 1979
 Corticarina seminigra Johnson, 1975
 Corticarina sericella (Motschulsky, 1867)
 Corticarina serrula Brethes, 1922
 Corticarina setigera (Belon, 1885)
 Corticarina silvicola Rücker, 1985
 Corticarina similata (Gyllenhal, 1827)
 Corticarina simoni Johnson, 1981
 Corticarina steinheili Reitter, 1880
 Corticarina strandi Johnson, 1972
 Corticarina sturmi Rücker, 1985
 Corticarina subcognata Johnson, 1979
 Corticarina subgibbosa Johnson, 1972
 Corticarina subnitida (Motschulsky, 1867)
 Corticarina szunyoghyi Rücker, 1980
 Corticarina torrida Johnson, 1981
 Corticarina trichonota (Belon, 1898)
 Corticarina truncatella (Mannerheim, 1844)
 Corticarina truncatipennis Johnson, 1979
 Corticarina turneri Johnson, 1975
 Corticarina upembae Dajoz, 1970
 Corticarina vanschuytbroecki Dajoz, 1970
 Corticarina viatica Johnson, 1997
 Corticarina williamsi Johnson, 1975
 Corticarina wittmeri Johnson, 1979
 Corticarina wolamo Johnson, 1979

References

Latridiidae genera